Bristol Township is one of the fourteen townships of Morgan County, Ohio, United States.  The 2000 census found 207 people in the township.

Geography
Located in the northern part of the county, it borders the following townships:
Meigs Township, Muskingum County - north
Brookfield Township, Noble County - northeast corner
Manchester Township - east
Center Township - southeast corner
Meigsville Township - south
Morgan Township - southwest
Bloom Township - west
Blue Rock Township, Muskingum County - northwest corner

No municipalities are located in Bristol Township.

Name and history
Statewide, the only other Bristol Township is located in Trumbull County.

Government
The township is governed by a three-member board of trustees, who are elected in November of odd-numbered years to a four-year term beginning on the following January 1. Two are elected in the year after the presidential election and one is elected in the year before it. There is also an elected township fiscal officer, who serves a four-year term beginning on April 1 of the year after the election, which is held in November of the year before the presidential election. Vacancies in the fiscal officership or on the board of trustees are filled by the remaining trustees.

As of 2007, the trustees are John Kalb, Walter Vanhorn, and Paul Wickham, and the clerk is Shirley Holland.

References

External links
County website

Townships in Morgan County, Ohio
Townships in Ohio